Route 97 is a north–south state highway in eastern Connecticut running for  from Route 12 in Norwich to US 44 in Pomfret.

Route description

After the overlap, it continues north and northeast through Hampton into Pomfret, where it ends at its northern of two intersections with US 44, also meeting Route 169.

History 
In 1922, the road from Abington to Pomfret Center along modern Route 97 was designated as State Highway 345. Further south, the road from Taftville to Baltic was part of State Highway 354, which continued past Baltic to Lebanon center. In the 1932 state highway renumbering, Highway 345 renumbered to Route 201, while most of Highway 354 (between Baltic and Lebanon center) became Route 207. Most of modern Route 97 was commissioned in 1932 as well, including the Taftville-Baltic portion of old Highway 354. The original Route 97 deviated from the current route at Station Road in Hampton and ran north to Route 91 (now Route 198) in Chaplin. It was relocated to its current route between Hampton and Abington using a previously unsigned state road (former SR 860) in 1934. At the same time, Route 97 absorbed former Route 201, extending the route to Pomfret Center.

Junction list

References

External links

097
Transportation in New London County, Connecticut
Transportation in Windham County, Connecticut